Six-time defending champion Richard Sears defeated Henry Slocum in the challenge round, 6–1, 6–3, 6–2 to win the men's singles tennis title at the 1887 U.S. National Championships.

Draw

Challenge round

Finals

Earlier rounds

Section 1

Section 2

References 
 

Men's singles
1887